Bicyrtes ventralis is a species of sand wasp in the family Crabronidae. It is found in Central America and North America.

References

Further reading

External links

 

Crabronidae
Insects described in 1824